Rosemond Teresa Marie Tuve (November 29, 1903 – December 20, 1964) was an American scholar of English literature, specializing in Renaissance literature—in particular, Edmund Spenser. She published four books on the subject (Elizabethan and Metaphysical Imagery: Renaissance Poetic and Twentieth-century Critics, A Reading of George Herbert, Images & Themes in Five Poems by Milton, and Allegorical Imagery; Some Mediaeval Books And Their Posterity) along with several essays.

In her professional life, Rosemond Tuve worked as a professor of English at many elite institutions. She was a Fellow in the English Departments at Bryn Mawr College. She then went on to be an English Instructor at Goucher College, Vassar College and Connecticut College. Tuve moved from English Instructor to full professorship at Connecticut College where she stayed for twenty nine years. During her time as a professor at Connecticut College, Tuve spent several semesters as a visiting lecturer at other academic institutions including the University of Minnesota and Harvard University. After Tuve left Connecticut College, she moved to a job as a lecturer at Princeton University, followed by a job as visiting professor and Senior Fellow of the Council of the Humanities at Princeton University. Finally, Rosemond Tuve was an English Professor at the University of Pennsylvania until she died in 1964.

Biography
She was born November 29, 1903, in Canton, South Dakota, the daughter of Anthony G. Tuve, the president of Augustana College, and Ida Larsen Tuve, instructor of music there. One of her older brothers is Merle Tuve, a geophysicist.

She received her BA in 1924 from the University of Minnesota, and received a scholarship for graduate study at Bryn Mawr College, where she was awarded an MA, in 1923. Following further study at Somerville College, Oxford, England, she received a PhD from Bryn Mayr in 1931. After further study in England and France, she was appointed instructor of English at Connecticut College in 1934. She was promoted to assistant professor in 1936, associate professor in 1942, and full professor in 1947. She remained at Connecticut until 1962, when she was appointed professor of English at the University of Pennsylvania, the first woman to be appointed to that position. After teaching there for three terms, she died of a stroke on December 20, 1964.

Publications
Her first published work, Seasons and Months: Studies in a Tradition of Middle English Poetry. was her PhD thesis, published in Paris by Libraire Universitarie in 1933.   She subsequently published the following books:
Elizabethan and Metaphysical Imagery: Renaissance Poetic and Twentieth-century Critics, 	Chicago, Ill., University of Chicago Press, 1947. 442 p. OCLC 245173
Reprinted: 1961, OCLC 12000218;  1971, 
Review, W K Wimsatt;   Journal of Aesthetics and Art Criticism, March, 1948, vol. 6, no. 3, p. 277-279
Review, "Tradition and the Academic Talent"   H. M. McLuhan The Hudson Review, Summer, 1948, vol. 1, no. 2, p. 270-273
Review, Rosemary Freeman Review of English Studies, October, 1948, vol. 24, no. 96, p. 331-332
Review, Marvin T Herrick;  Modern Language Notes, February, 1949, vol. 64, no. 2, p. 125-127
A Reading of George Herbert Chicago, University of Chicago Press, 1952. 215 p. OCLC 357917
Review, Arnold Stein Modern Language Notes, December, 1954, vol. 69, no. 8, p. 610-613
Review, Joan Bennett Modern Philology, November, 1953, vol. 51, no. 2, p. 135-137
Images & Themes in Five Poems by Milton, Cambridge, Harvard University Press, 1957. 161 p. OCLC 5212894
Repr, 1967
Review, Millar MacLure Modern Philology, August, 1958, vol. 56, no. 1, p. 64-65
Review, Arnold Stein;  Journal of Aesthetics and Art Criticism,  September, 1958, vol. 17, no. 1, p. 119-121
Review, A J Smith; Review of English Studies, August, 1959, vol. 10, no. 39, p. 309-311
Review, Merritt Y Hughes;  Modern Language Notes, November, 1958, vol. 73, no. 7, p. 527-532
Allegorical Imagery; Some Mediaeval Books And Their Posterity, Princeton, N.J., Princeton University Press, 1966. 461 p. OCLC 7167435
Review, Richard H Green, Comparative Literature, Winter, 1967, vol. 19, no. 1, p. 83-86
Review, William Matthews Renaissance Quarterly, Autumn, 1967, vol. 20, no. 3, p. 345-347
Review, Robert Kaske Speculum: A Journal of Mediaeval Studies, Jan., 1967, vol. 42, no. 1, p. 196-199

A selection of her essays, was published as Essays: Spenser, Herbert, Milton, ed. by Thomas P Roche, 	Princeton [N.J.] Princeton University Press, 1970.

Education 
 University of Minnesota (June, 1924), Graduated cum laude
 Bryn Mawr College, Master's degree (May, 1925)
 Somerville College, Oxford (1928-1929)
 Bryn Mawr College, PH.D (1931)
 Augustana College, Doctor of Letters degree (1952)
 Wheaton College, Doctors of Letters Degree (1957)
 Mt. Holyoke College, Doctor of Letters degree (1959)
 Carleton College, Doctor od Letters degree (1961)
 Syracuse University, Doctor of Humane Letters (1962)

Work 
 Fellow in English Department, Bryn Mawr College (1925-1926)
 English Instructor, Goucher College (1928-1928)
 English Instructor, Vassar College (1929-1932)
 English Instructor, English Professor, Connecticut College (1934-1963)
 Visiting Lecturer, University of Minnesota (1952)
 Visiting Lecturer, Harvard University (1956)
 Senior Fulbright Research Fellow, Oxford University (1957-1958)
 Lecturer, Princeton University (May and April 1959)
 Fellow of the American Academy of Arts and Sciences (May, 1959)
 NATO Research Fellowship, University of Aarhus, Denmark (1960)
 Visiting Professor, Senior Fellow of the Council of the Humanities, Princeton University (1961-1962)
 Professor of English, University of Pennsylvania (1963-1964)

Honors
1952: Honorary Doctor of Letters (Ll.D.) from Augustana College. 
1955: Achievement Award, American Association of University Women. 
1956: Visiting Lecturer, Harvard University
1957: Honorary Doctor of Letters (Ll.D.) from Wheaton College.
1957-58, Senior Fulbright Research Fellow, Oxford.
1959: Fellow, American Academy of Arts and Sciences
1959, Honorary Doctor of Letters (Ll.D.) from Mt. Holyoke College.
1960, NATO Research Fellowship, University of Aarhus
1961, Honorary Doctor of Letters, Carleton College.
1961-62 Visiting Professor, Princeton University
1963, Honorary Doctor of Humane Letters, Syracuse University.

References

1903 births
1964 deaths
Bryn Mawr College faculty
Bryn Mawr College alumni
Fellows of the American Academy of Arts and Sciences
People from Canton, South Dakota
University of Minnesota alumni
Alumni of Somerville College, Oxford
Connecticut College faculty
University of Pennsylvania faculty
Princeton University faculty